JumpStart Kindergarten (known as Jump Ahead Classic Kindergarten in the UK) is an educational video game developed by Fanfare Software and released by Knowledge Adventure on the MS-DOS platform in 1994 (v1.0). It was the first product released in the JumpStart series and, as its name suggests, it is intended to teach kindergarten students. According to the Knowledge Adventure founder Bill Gross, it is the first educational software program that covers the entire kindergarten curriculum. It was ported to the Windows and Macintosh systems in 1995 (v1.2). It was updated with a new version on 24 November 1997 (v2.0). In 2000, the game was specially designed on VHS. That same year it was updated with additional content in a 2-CD Deluxe version in 2000 (v2.6), that included JumpStart Around the World. Eventually it was replaced in 2002 by JumpStart Advanced Kindergarten.

Gameplay
The game takes place in a kindergarten schoolhouse. The game is hosted by the teacher, an anthropomorphic gray bunny named Mr. Hopsalot. The specifics of the game vary from the two versions, but in both the user may access educational activities and simple games by clicking on objects. In the early version, all of the activities are accessible from a single screen inside the classroom. In the re-release, different areas of the classroom and the nearby areas outside containing activities may be explored and as a new addition playing activities earns the player stars.

Educational goals
During computer learning, the game teaches children basic pre-reading, vocabulary and math, plus songs five for entertainment. It introduces and reinforces lesson related to the Kindergarten curriculum and parents are able to check their children's progress report via a comprehensive Progress Report.

References

External links
Review of 1998 version on SuperKids

1994 video games
1995 video games
1998 video games
2000 video games
Children's educational video games
Kindergarten
Video game remakes
DOS games
JumpStart
Windows games
Classic Mac OS games
Video games about rabbits and hares
Video games developed in the United States
Single-player video games